Anne Crawford-Lindsay, Duchess of Rothes (1 September 1631 – 1 July 1689), was the daughter of John Lindsay, 1st Earl of Lindsay, 17th Earl of Crawford, lord high treasurer of Scotland and Lady Margaret Hamilton.

Marriage
She married John Leslie, who was the 7th Earl of Rothes and 1st Duke of Rothes, and had two daughters:

Margaret Leslie, 8th Countess of Rothes (d. 20 August 1700), married Charles Hamilton, 5th Earl of Haddington (c. 1650 – 1685), and had issue.
Lady Christian Leslie, married firstly James Graham, 3rd Marquess of Montrose (1657–1684), and had issue, and secondly Sir John Bruce (before 1671 – 19 March 1710).

Anne was a devout Presbyterian, and was well known in her day to have had allegiances with the Covenanters. She would regularly attend field preaching meetings, known as conventicles, and on many occasions would invite Covenanters to Leslie House in Leslie as her guests. Her husband, however, believed strongly in restoring the episcopacy. Serving faithfully under Charles II's government, he was naturally opposed to the Covenanters, but for the sake of his wife he generally tolerated them. If he would see any of them at Leslie House, he would remark to Anne, "My lady, I would advise you to keep your chickens in about, else I may pick up some of them." On one occasion, a warrant moved Rothes to conduct a search for any preachers hiding on his estate, and he remarked to his wife, "My hawks will be out tonight, my lady, so you had better take care of your blackbirds!" As a warning, Anne would signal the Covenanters hiding on their estate by placing a white sheet on one of the trees on a hill just behind Leslie House, which could be seen at quite a distance. The Covenanters would also seek the duchess to exert her influence over her husband and the Privy Council, interceding on their behalf in order to lessen the severity of the punishments that would have been carried out by the officials of the day (one of the most notable repressers being Archbishop Sharp, who was a distant kinsman of the duke of Rothes and on occasion was a guest at Leslie House).

References
James Anderson (1857), The Ladies of the Covenant: Memoirs of Distinguished Scottish Female Characters (Kessinger Publishing, LLC, 2007).

External links
Clan Leslie Trust

1689 deaths
1631 births
Anne